The Prologue from Ohrid was compiled by Saint Nikolai Velimirovic. Bishop Nikolai's work is a compilation of lives of saints, hymns, reflections, and homilies. It was originally written in Serbian.

Published editions
Velimirovic, Nikolai. The Prologue from Ohrid: Lives of Saints, Hymns, Reflections and Homilies for Every Day of the Year.
Volume I
Volume II
Bishop Nikolai Velimirovic. Prologue from Ochrid [sic]. Lazarica Press

External links
The Prologue Online - from the Russian Orthodox Church Outside of Russia, Australia and New Zealand Diocese

References

Christian literature